Minirhodacarellus is a genus of mites in the family Rhodacaridae. There is a single species in this genus, Minirhodacarellus minimus.

References

Rhodacaridae